First Capital University of Bangladesh is a private university in Chuadanga, Bangladesh. Established in 2012, it is the first private university in Khulna Division. Hazrat Al is the vice-chancellor of the university. The chairman is Solaiman Haque Joarder, the president of the district unit of the Awami League.

Faculties and departments 
 Department of Electrical & Electronic Engineering
 Department of Computer Science & Engineering
 Department of Business Administration
 Department of English
 Department of Law
 MBA (Master of Business Administration)
 AGRICULTURE
 Department of Sociology

References 

Engineering universities of Bangladesh
Technological institutes of Bangladesh
Private universities in Bangladesh
Educational institutions established in 2012
2012 establishments in Bangladesh
Educational institutions of Khulna Division
Universities and colleges in Chuadanga District